Tiar (also Romanized as Tīār; also known as Nīāl and Tiaf) is a village in Chelav Rural District, in the Central District of Amol County, Mazandaran Province, Iran. At the 2006 census, its population was 88, in 33 families.

References 

Populated places in Amol County